This is a list of seasons completed by the Rutgers Scarlet Knights men's college basketball team.

Seasons

References

 
Rutgers Scarlet Knights
Rutgers Scarlet Knights basketball seasons